R (Ann Marie Rogers) v Swindon Primary Care Trust [2006] EWCA Civ 392 is a UK enterprise law case, concerning health care in the UK.

Facts 
Ms Rogers claimed that she should be treated with Herceptin for her breast cancer, although it was not yet licensed by the National Institute for Health and Care Excellence. Dr Cole, her consultant, was turned down by Swindon Primary Care Trust for the treatment. She could only afford two doses herself. The PCT would only fund if her case was ‘exceptional’ but after a review it decided her case was not, because all women with stage 1 breast cancer were in the same position as Ms Rogers. She brought judicial review, arguing the PCT had acted irrationally.

Bean J dismissed Ms Rogers' appeal for judicial review.

Judgment
The Court of Appeal held the ‘exceptionality’ review had been meaningless, and the decision was irrational.

Sir Anthony Clarke MR said the following:

See also

United Kingdom enterprise law

Notes

References

United Kingdom enterprise case law